Carrasco may refer to:

Places
Bolivia
Carrasco Province, Cochabamba, a province of Cochabamba Department, Bolivia
Carrasco National Park, a national park in Cochabamba Department, Bolivia
Brazil
Carrasco Bonito, a Brazilian municipality in the state of Tocantins 
Dominican Republic
Carrasco, Dominican Republic, a village in north-central Dominican Republic
Panama
Carrasco, Panama, a village in western Panama
Uruguay
Arroyo Carrasco, a creek separating Canelones Department and Montevideo Department, Uruguay
Barra de Carrasco, a seaside town of Canelones Department, Uruguay
Carrasco, Montevideo, a seaside suburb of Montevideo, Uruguay
Carrasco International Airport, the largest airport in Uruguay
Carrasco Norte, a neighbourhood of Montevideo, Uruguay
Parque Carrasco, a neighbourhood of Ciudad de la Costa, Uruguay
Paso Carrasco, a city in Canelones Department, Uruguay
San José de Carrasco, a neighbourhood of Ciudad de la Costa, Uruguay
India
Carrasco Village, a village in Goa, India

Other uses
Carrasco (surname)
4171 Carrasco, a main-belt asteroid discovered in 1982
Carrasco Polo Club, a Uruguayan multisport club best known for its rugby team
Estadio Francisco Artés Carrasco, Carrasco stadium, a multi-use stadium in Lorca, Spain
Hotel Carrasco, a seaside hotel in Montevideo, Uruguay